This list of University of Leicester people is a selected list of notable past staff and students of the University of Leicester.

Chancellors
Edgar Adrian, 1st Baron Adrian (1957–1971)
Alan Lloyd Hodgkin (1971–1984)
Sir George Porter (1984–1995)
Sir Michael Atiyah (1995–2005)
Sir Peter Williams (2005–2010)
Bruce Grocott, Baron Grocott (2013–)

Vice-Chancellors
Charles Wilson (1957–1961)
Fraser Noble (1962–1976) 
Maurice Shock (1977–1987)
Kenneth Edwards (1987–1999)
Robert Burgess (1999–2014)
Paul Boyle (2014–2019)
Nishan Canagarajah (from November 2019)

Notable academics

Khurshid Ahmad, Islamic scholar
Penelope Allison, Professor of Archaeology
Lyman Andrews, American Studies
Isobel Armstrong, scholar of nineteenth-century poetry and women's writing
Graeme Barker, Disney Professor of Archaeology, University of Cambridge
Richard Bonney, historian
Alan Bryman, social scientist
Grace Burrows, violinist and orchestra conductor
Neil Christie, Reader in Archaeology
Nicholas T. Clerk, Ghanaian academic, public administrator and Presbyterian minister
John Coffey, Professor of Early Modern history.
Heather Couper, astronomer and television presenter
Rosemary Crompton, sociologist
Nicholas J. Cull, US historian
Panicos Demetriades, economist and Governor of the Central Bank of Cyprus
Gabriel Dover, geneticist
Eric Dunning, sports sociologist
Christopher Dyer, medieval historian
Colin Eaborn FRS, chemist
Norbert Elias, German sociologist
Brian J. Ford, scientist, visiting professor
G. S. Fraser, Scottish poet
Anthony Giddens, prominent sociologist, taught social psychology at Leicester
Reuben Goodstein, mathematician, proponent of Goodstein's theorem
Cosmo Graham, Public law and Competition law specialist. Member of the Competition Commission
Sarah Hainsworth, Professor of Materials and Forensic Engineering, involved in analysing the wounds on the skeleton of Richard III
Rosalind Hill, historian
Jeffrey A. Hoffman, NASA astronaut and physicist
Richard Hoggart, sociologist
W. G. Hoskins, (1931–1952) (1965–1968), local historian, author of The Making of the English Landscape
Norman Housley, crusading historian
Jeremy Howick, director of the Stoneygate Centre for Excellence in Empathic Healthcare and inaugural Professor of Empathic Healthcare
Arthur Humphreys, inaugural Professor of English and first Dean of the Faculty of Arts
Leonard Huxley, physicist
Suzanne Imber, astrophysicist 
Sir Alec Jeffreys, geneticist, discoverer of genetic fingerprinting
Hans Kornberg, biochemist
Philip Larkin, librarian and poet
David Mattingly, Roman archaeologist
John McManners, former Head of History Dept., Regius Professor of History at the University of Oxford until retirement
Marilyn Palmer, archaeologist and landscape historian, Professor of Industrial Archaeology and Head of the School of Archaeology and Ancient History (2000–2006)
Ken Pounds, Emeritus Professor of Physics, discovered black holes were common in the universe
Charles Rees, organic chemist
Martin Rees, Baron Rees of Ludlow, the Astronomer Royal, visiting professor at Leicester
Adrian Henry Wardle Robinson, geographer and historian of maritime surveying
J.B. Schneewind, philosophy professor, Johns Hopkins University
Malcolm Shaw QC, The Sir Robert Jennings Professor of International Law, prominent international lawyer and jurist
Jack Simmons, professor of history 1947–1975
Brian Simon, professor of education 1966-1980
Sami Zubaida, political scientist
Chris Allen (academic), British sociologist and associate professor at the centre for hate studies at university of Leicester
Loretta Lees, Urban Geographer

Notable alumni
See also Alumni of the University of Leicester.

Public figures
Malik Zahoor Ahmad, Pakistan Minister of Information
Peter Atkins, physical chemist
Natalie Bennett, Leader of the Green Party of England and Wales
David Blanchflower, economist, Dartmouth College professor
Sir Malcolm Bradbury, author
Justin Chadwick, actor and director
Philip Campbell, editor-in-chief of Nature
Andy Carter - Conservative MP for Warrington South.
Michael Cordy, novelist
Liam Donaldson, Chief Medical Officer
Bruce Grocott, Baron Grocott, former MP, Captain of the Gentlemen-at-Arms
Phelan Hill, Team GB coxswain and Olympic bronze medalist
Baroness Howarth of Breckland, peer, on the board of CAFCASS
Atifete Jahjaga, President of Kosovo
:Jinnwoo, British Folk Musician and Visual Artist 
Graham Joyce, novelist 
Jyrki Katainen, Prime Minister of Finland 
Norman Lamb, MP	
Martin Löb, Logician and proposer of Löb's theorem
Her Imperial Highness Princess Mako of Akishino
Pete McCarthy, writer, broadcaster, comedian
Sunshine Martyn, Reality television star
Bob Mortimer, comedian
Massimiliano Neri, fashion model
Michael Nicholson, journalist
Bob Parr MBE, multi Emmy Award-winning television producer and former Special Air Service soldier
David Perry, barrister
J. H. Plumb, historian of 18th-century Britain
Aaron Porter, President, National Union of Students (United Kingdom) 2010-11
Patrick Redmond, novelist
C. P. Snow, Physical Chemist, Director of the English Electric Company, Author, Life Peer
Mary Ann Steggles, Commonwealth Scholar from Canada, international expert on British sculpture exported to the Indian subcontinent and Southeast Asia
Sir John Stevens, former Metropolitan Police Commissioner and former adviser on international security issues to Gordon Brown
John Sutherland, Guardian Columnist, Emeritus Professor of English Literature, University College London
Laurie Taylor, broadcaster, actor, sociologist
Philip Tew, professor of English (Post-1900 Literature), Brunel University, novelist
Steven Thiru, current president of Malaysian Bar
Jon Tickle, celebrity
Storm Thorgerson, artist
Tony Underwood, England rugby union international
Sir Alan Walters, economist and former Chief Economic Adviser to Margaret Thatcher, 1981–83 and 1989. 
Andrew Waterman, poet
Quentin Willson, motoring journalist/expert and TV presenter
Bryan R. Wilson, Oxford sociologist
Ted Wragg, educationalist

References

 
Leicester
Leicester-related lists